Kamraniyeh is a village in South Khorasan Province, Iran.

Kamraniyeh may also refer to:
 Kamraniyeh-ye Bala, Kerman Province
 Kamraniyeh-ye Pain, Kerman Province
 Kamranieh, a neighbourhood of Tehran